Mummidivarappadu is a village in Ravulapalem Mandal, Dr. B.R. Ambedkar Konaseema district in the state of Andhra Pradesh in India.

Geography 

Demographics 
 India census, Mummidivarappadu had a population of 1,720, out of which 896 were male and 824 were female. The population of children below 6 years of age was 9%. The literacy rate of the village was 77%.

References 

Villages in Ravulapalem mandal